One Hundred and Forty Days Under the World is a 1964 New Zealand short documentary film about Antarctica. It was nominated for an Academy Award for Best Documentary Short.

References

External links

Watch One Hundred and Forty Days Under the World at NZ On Screen

1964 films
1960s New Zealand films
1964 documentary films
1964 short films
1960s short documentary films
1960s English-language films
New Zealand short documentary films
Documentary films about Antarctica
National Film Unit